Julius Skarba-Wallraf (22 February 1883 – 2 February 1943) was a German architect. His work was part of the architecture event in the art competition at the 1912 Summer Olympics.

References

1883 births
1943 deaths
19th-century German architects
20th-century German architects
Olympic competitors in art competitions
Architects from Budapest